George Smart Comrie (31 March 1885 – 15 April 1958) was a Scottish professional footballer who played in the Scottish League for Dundee as a left half and was a member of the club's 1909–10 Scottish Cup-winning team. He also played in the Southern League for Millwall and the Football League for Huddersfield Town.

Personal life 
Comrie's relatives James, John and Malcolm were also footballers. Comrie served as a sergeant in the Black Watch during the First World War and his son Daniel served with the Scots Guards during the Second World War.

Career statistics

Honours 
Dundee
Scottish Cup: 1909–10

References

Scottish footballers
English Football League players
Dundee F.C. players
Huddersfield Town A.F.C. players
People from Denny, Falkirk
Footballers from Falkirk (council area)
1885 births
1958 deaths
Association football wing halves
Third Lanark A.C. players
Millwall F.C. players
Southern Football League players
Scottish Football League players
Forfar Athletic F.C. players
Black Watch soldiers
British Army personnel of World War I
Comrie family